Thomas Ernest Bonner (born 6 February 1988) is a Scottish footballer who plays for Dartford.

Career
Bonner began his career in the Queens Park Rangers Academy before he signed a professional contract with Northampton Town in 2005. He went on loan to Bedford Town and Nuneaton Borough before he signed with Rushden & Diamonds in January 2007. At Rushden he went out on loan to Bedford Town and Heybridge Swifts. During his spell with Bedford Town he notably scored the winning goal in a play off final against Chippenham Town to secure Bedford's promotion to the Conference South. He was released by Rushden in May 2007 and went on to play non-league football with Hinckley United and Ilkeston Town. In 2010 Bonner joined Conference Premier side Dartford and after spending three seasons at Princes Park he signed with Cambridge United in May 2013. He made his Football League debut on 9 August 2014 in a 1–0 win at home against Plymouth Argyle.

In September 2014, Bonner joined Conference Premier side Dover Athletic on loan, helping the club to record nine clean sheets in his first twenty-four appearances, including in two FA Cup  shock wins over Football League sides Morecambe and Cheltenham Town as the club reached the FA Cup Third Round against Premier League side Crystal Palace, where they lost to a strong Palace squad.

Bonner signed for Ebbsfleet United on an 18-month contract on 15 January 2015.

On 1 June 2016, Bonner rejoined former side Dartford for the 2016–17 National League South season.

On 2 June 2018, Bonner was sent off representing Hackney pub The Gun in the BT Sport Pub Cup final at Leicester City's King Power Stadium.

Honours
Cambridge United

FA Trophy: 2013–14
Dartford

 Conference South Play-off winners: 2011–12
 Kent Senior Cup: 2019–20, 2021–22

Individual

 National League South Team of the Year: 2016–17, 2017–18, 2021–22

References

External links

1988 births
Living people
Footballers from the London Borough of Camden
Scottish footballers
Scotland youth international footballers
English Football League players
Northampton Town F.C. players
Bedford Town F.C. players
Rushden & Diamonds F.C. players
Heybridge Swifts F.C. players
Corby Town F.C. players
Hinckley United F.C. players
Ilkeston Town F.C. (1945) players
Dartford F.C. players
Cambridge United F.C. players
Dover Athletic F.C. players
Ebbsfleet United F.C. players
Association football defenders